Jan Oosthoek (5 March 1898 – 8 March 1973) was a Dutch footballer. He competed in the men's tournament at the 1924 Summer Olympics.

References

External links
 

1898 births
1973 deaths
Dutch footballers
Netherlands international footballers
Olympic footballers of the Netherlands
Footballers at the 1924 Summer Olympics
Footballers from Rotterdam
Association football midfielders